Saint Vincent’s College (Spanish: Colegio de San Vicente), officially known as Saint Vincent's College, Incorporated and abbreviated as SVCI, is the oldest and the most recognized higher educational institution in Zamboanga del Norte, Philippines; situated in the heart of Dipolog. SVC is a private, nonsectarian, non-stock and non-profit institution duly approved and authorized by the Department of Education and the Commission on Higher Education to offer course programs from kindergarten to postgraduate levels.

SVC is the first institution in the Province of Zamboanga del Norte granted government authority and recognition to offer a doctorate degree. Alumni and students of the college are referred to as Vincentians.

History
Saint Vincent's College, with its address at Padre Jose Ramon Street, Estaka, Dipolog, Zamboanga del Norte, Philippines; was founded on June 17, 1917, incorporated on June 20, 1917, and finally organized on July 20, 1917. It was first called the Dipolog Parochial School with the following Jesuit priests as the first incorporators and officers of the school administration: Bishop Ralph Curam DD. Rev. Fr. Francisco Garcia, Rev. Fr. Manuel Valles, Rev. Fr. Eliseo Gil, Rev. Fr. Hobac, and Rev. Fr. Handueza.

In 1932, Fr. Eduardo Aniceto, the new Director reorganized the school to cope with the standards prescribed by the Secretary of Education, working for a government recognition to operate a complete elementary school. The seventh grade was added to the general intermediate course on May 31, 1938.

The community worked for the establishment of a catholic high school that would train and prepare the youth for academic, moral and spiritual responsibilities. Fr. Benigno Dagani, S.J., a Filipino priest together with the Board of Directors, asked help from the Bishop, Msgr. Luis del Rosario, S.J., D.D., for the establishment of a catholic high school. The institution was named Saint Vincent’s School, in honor of St. Vincent Ferrer, the second Patron Saint of the City. In order to give equity to young girls of Dipolog, the girls’ department was established. The headship of the school was taken over by a new director, Rev. Fr. Pio J. Saavedra.

In 1947, Rev. Fr. Engracio S. Rivera, a clergy, was appointed Director. He gave the school motto, “Induamor Arma Lucis”, meaning “Let us clad ourselves with the armor of light”. The college level was established with the end in view of raising the academic standards. Permit was granted to open first year of Junior Normal College Course, first year pre-law, and first year Education Course on June 18, 1947. It became Saint Vincent’s College on February 28, 1950.

The College endured financial difficulties from 1952 to 1960. In the summer of 1960, a 37-year-old priest from Sevilla Bohol, Rev. Fr. Constancio P. Mesiona, arrived to take over the new directorship of the College. Rev. Fr. Mesiona graduated magna cum laude for his seminary course and for his master's at the San Jose Seminary, Manila. He earned his Doctor of Canon Law (J.C.D.) at the Universidad Pontifica de Comillas in Santander, Spain.

In 1963, a separate Accounting Office was created. Each department became independent from the other departments. Gonzales type buildings, which are still existing these days, were built one after another, replacing old structures. Qualified teachers were hired to teach their major fields of specialization, and books and laboratory equipment were purchased. Musical instruments were acquired to equip the newly organized Saint Vincent’s College Orchestra, the best in Mindanao at the time.

In 1967, Bishop Felix Zafra assumed as Bishop of Dipolog and as the President of Saint Vincent’s College. He had served in that capacity until his transfer to Bohol in 1987.

During the seventies, more courses were offered and recognized. On July 2, 1975, the Master of Arts (M.A.) in Education as well as the Master in Business Administration (MBA) were recognized. The M.A.T.E.A. as well as the opening of the second year of B.S. in Kindergarten were given permit on May 22, 1978.

Fr. Mesiona built more buildings to accommodate the growing student population. The present Administration Building was built from his retirement pay. During his term, the Bachelor of Science in Accountancy, Master of Public Administration (M.P.A.), and Doctor of Educational Management (E.M.D.) were recognized.

Upon the demise of Fr. Mesiona on April 3, 1995 at the age of 72 after serving the institution for 35 years, Bishop Jose R. Manguiran, the now immediate past President, took over the reins as the College Director. In June 1996, Fr. Beda B. Belotindos was appointed to act as Director for three years. By June, 1999, a new structure was adopted with the appointment of three Vice Presidents, namely: Rev. Fr. Bienvenido E. Hamoy, VP for Finance; Dr. Alfreda B. Calamba, VP for Administration; and Dr. Jose M. Baloria, Jr., VP for Academics and secretary. Rev. Fr. Gregorio B. Canonigo, Seminary Director and Dr. Gaudiosa M. Ochotorena, Dean of Graduate School, complete the Board of Trustees.

The school opened the courses of Bachelor of Science in Computer Engineering and Bachelor of Science in Electronics and Communication Engineering on May 22, 2000.

The present administration created the Office of Alumni Affairs chaired by Dr. Bebita H. Esparaguera who initiated the revival of the alumni association, which has lain dormant since 1964. A group of dedicated alumni headed by Atty. Uldarico B. Mejorada and retired Judge Juanito A. Bernad who were subsequently elected President and Vice President, respectively, drafted the Constitution and By-laws of the Saint Vincent’s College Alumni Association, Inc.

On October 1, 2000, the alumni officers, directors, and members in attendance were inducted into office in a fitting ceremony held at the new Millennium Building.

Current Administration
 Chairman: Most Rev. Fr. Severo C. Caermare, D.D.
 President: Rev. Fr. Nathaniele A. Denlaoso
 VP for Finance: Rev. Fr. Albert Anthony K. Bael
 VP for Academics: Dr. Rosalinda C. Baloria
 Dean, Student Affairs Mr. Noel G. Lopecillo, MAED
 Alumni, Community Extension and Linkages Director: Mr. Raymond Chris P. Maribojoc, MPM, MBA, PHF, FRIM, CTT
 Research and Development Director: Mr. Maisalian Julian P. Acopiado, MAED
 Campus Minister: Rev. Fr. Rodel A. Agodera
 Diocesan Schools Superintendent: Dr. Alfreda B. Calamba
 Dean, College of Arts, Sciences and Education: Dr. Mario B. Boco
 Dean, College of Business, Accountancy, Engineering, Computer Studies and International Hospitality Management: Dr. Joseph G. Refugio, FBE
 Dean, College of Criminology: Mr. Renante B. Salvaña
 Program Head (Accountancy & Accounting Technology) : Mr. Angel D. Calaguian, CPA, MBA, CTT
 Program Head (Computer Studies): Dr. George P. Caroro
 Program Head (Computer Engineering) 
 Guidance Counselor and PESO Manager: Ms. Sylvia B. Sumondong, Ph.D, RGC
 Junior High School and Elementary Principal: Rev. Fr. Simplicio Lomarda, Jr.
 Senior High School Principal: Dr. Rosalinda C. Baloria
 Registrar & MBA Chairperson: Ms. Fabiola C. Sia, EMD (cand)
 Accounting Head: Mrs. Eda A. Saguin
 MPM Chairperson: Dr. Rebecca B. Makintura
 Post Graduate Chairperson: Dr. Alfreda B. Calamba
 MAED Chairperson: Dr. Rosalinda C. Baloria

Degrees Offered

 Doctor of Educational Management (E.M.D.)
 Master in Business Administration (M.B.A.) Thesis & Non-Thesis
 Master in Public Management (M.P.M.) Thesis & Non-Thesis
 Master of Arts in Education (M.A.ED) Thesis & Non-Thesis
 Master in Education major in English (M.E.)
 Master in Education major in Filipino (M.E.)
 Master in Education major in Mathematics (M.E.)
 Bachelor of Arts (A.B.)major in Communication Arts
 Bachelor of Arts (A.B.)major in English
 Bachelor of Arts (A.B.)major in Economics
 Bachelor of Arts (A.B.)major in Filipino
 Bachelor of Arts (A.B.)major in Political Science
 Bachelor of Arts (A.B.)major in Philosophy
 Bachelor of Secondary Education (B.S.ED)
 Bachelor of Elementary Education (B.E.ED)
 Bachelor of Science in Business Administration (BSBA)
 Bachelor of Science in Accountancy (BSA)
 Bachelor of Science in Accounting Technology (BSAcT)
 Bachelor of Science in Office Administration (BSOA)
 Bachelor of Science in Computer Science (BSCS)
 Bachelor of Science in Computer Engineering (BSCpE)
 Bachelor of Science in Electronics & Communication Engineering (BSECE)
 Bachelor of Science in Tourism Management (BSTM)
 Bachelor of Science in Hotel and Restaurant Management (BSHRM)
 Bachelor of Science in Criminology (BS Criminology)
 Bachelor of Science in Information Technology (BSIT)
 Bachelor of Science in Information System (BSIS)

Technical and Vocational Courses accredited by TESDA
 Caregiving National Certificate Level II
 Cookery National Certificate II
 Computer System Servicing National Certificate II
 Bookkeeping National Certificate III
 Training Methodology I 
 Health Care Services National Certificate Level II
 Front Office Services National Certificate Level II
 Housekeeping National Certificate Level II
 Bartending National Certificate Level II
 Food & Beverages Services National Certificate Level II
TESDA Accredited Competency Assessment Centers in:
Cookery NC II
Food & Beverage Services NC II
Housekeeping NC II
Front Office Services NC II
Bartending NC II
Bookkeeping NC II
Computer System Servicing NC II
Caregiving NC II
Health Care Services NC II
Trainers Methodology NC II

Short Courses

Basic Education

 Complete Elementary (I – VI)
 Complete Secondary (VII – X)

Notable Vincentians
General Alexander B. Yano (HS, 1969) - 38th Chief of Staff of the Armed Forces of the Philippines, and former Ambassador to Brunei Darrussalam.

References

http://www.mb.com.ph/issues/2006/11/13/SCAU2006111379325.html, http://www.ched.gov.ph/hei_dir/HEIDirJan2008/jan8Region09.pdf

See also
Roman Catholic Diocese of Dipolog

Dipolog
Education in Dipolog
Educational institutions established in 1917
1917 establishments in the Philippines
Universities and colleges in Zamboanga del Norte